The Roman Catholic Archdiocese of Lille (Latin: Archidioecesis Insulensis; French: Archidiocèse de Lille) is an archdiocese of the Latin Church of the Roman Catholic Church in France.
 
Its cathedral episcopal see is a Marian Minor Basilica: Basilique-cathédrale Notre-Dame de la Treille, in Lille, Nord, Hauts-de-France.

History 
Erected on 25 October 1913 originally as the Diocese of Lille, a suffragan of the Metropolitan Archdiocese of Cambrai, on territory split off from the then Metropolitan Roman Catholic Archdiocese of Cambrai, it encompasses the arrondissements of Dunkerque and Lille, within the department of Nord in the Region of Nord-Pas-de-Calais.

It was elevated to a Metropolitan Archdiocese by Pope Benedict XVI on March 29, 2008.

Province 
Its ecclesiastical province comprises the Metropolitan's own Archdiocese and two suffragan sees :
 its formerly Metropolitan mother the Archdiocese of Cambrai
 the Roman Catholic Diocese of Arras.

Ordinaries 
Bishops of Lille
 Alexis-Armand Charost (21 November 1913 – 18 June 1920)
 Hector-Raphaël Quilliet (18 June 1920 – retired 23 March 1928)
 Achille Liénart (6 October 1928  – 7 March 1968)
 Adrien-Edmond-Maurice Gand (7 March 1968 – retired 13 August 1983)
 Jean-Félix-Albert-Marie Vilnet (13 August 1983 – retired 2 July 1998)
 Gérard Defois (2 July 1998 – retired 1 February 2008)
 Laurent Ulrich (2008.02.01 – 2008.03.29)

Metropolitan Archbishops of Lille
 Laurent Ulrich (29 March 2008 – 26 April 2022)

See also
 Catholic Church in France
 List of Catholic dioceses in France

References

Sources

Books

External links
  Centre national des Archives de l'Église de France, L’Épiscopat francais depuis 1919, retrieved: 2016-12-24. 
 Official Website
 Entry of the Archdiocese of Lille on Catholic Hierarchy
 GCatholic.org with links to incumbent pages

Roman Catholic dioceses in France
1913 establishments in France